Ute Hommola (born 20 January 1952 in Weißenborn, Saxony) is a former German athlete who mainly competed in the women's javelin throw event.

She competed for East Germany at the 1980 Summer Olympics held in Moscow, Russia where she won the bronze medal in the javelin throw event.

References

profile

1952 births
Living people
People from Mittelsachsen
East German female javelin throwers
German female javelin throwers
Olympic athletes of East Germany
Olympic bronze medalists for East Germany
Athletes (track and field) at the 1980 Summer Olympics
European Athletics Championships medalists
Medalists at the 1980 Summer Olympics
Olympic bronze medalists in athletics (track and field)
Sportspeople from Saxony